Kuoloyarvi is a rural locality (an inhabited locality) in Kandalakshsky District of Murmansk Oblast, Russia, located north of the Arctic Circle at an altitude of  above sea level. It had no recorded population as of the 2010 Census.

History 
Kuoloyarvi used to be part of Finland as a former town called Kuolajärvi then renamed as Salla after the Municipality of Salla when the name of the municipality of Kuolajärvi was changed into Salla in 1936. During the Winter War, the Battle of Salla existed in this former town. It was captured by Soviet forces on December 9, 1939. To counterattack the Soviets, the Finnish Air Force bombed Salla three days later. 

However after the Winter War, Salla was annexed into the Soviet Union, then being renamed into Kuoloyarvi, which was similar to the old name. The people who previously lived in this town had been evacuated by the Finnish government.

References

Notes

Sources

Rural localities in Murmansk Oblast
Kandalakshsky District